Dream TV is a Turkish television channel owned by Demirören Group, which broadcasts music clips.

Dream TV Shows
 Genç İz (Hazal Kazancı & Emre Fakioglu)
 Dream Hits
 Ana Sahne (Main Stage / İpek Atcan)
 Evdeki Ses (House of Sound /Pelin Orhuner)
 Hayal Sahnesi (Dream Stage)
 Rock Me
 Advanced
 Popcorn
 Dream 10
 T-Rock
 T-Rap
 Dans@
 4x4
 Lirix
 Dream Hafta Sonu (Dream Weekend / Ezgi Cantekin)

Dream TV Presenters
 Hazal Kazancı  
 Emre Fakıığlu  
 Pelin Orhuner

Dream TV  Events & Festivals 
2013
Monofest 
The Sound of Change
(2011)
 Massive Weekend
 Freshtival
 VFree Zone Festival
 Spice UP Festival 
 Rock'n Coke
 Sonisphere Festival (Turkey)
 One Love Festival
 Van İçin Rock (ROCK FOR VAN)

Logo history

External links 
Official site (in Turkish)

Television stations in Turkey
Turkish-language television stations
Music television channels
Television channels and stations established in 2003
Music organizations based in Turkey